Five Finger Exercise is a 1962 American drama film made by Columbia Pictures, directed by Daniel Mann and produced by Frederick Brisson from a screenplay by Frances Goodrich and Albert Hackett, based on the play by Peter Shaffer.

The film stars Rosalind Russell, Jack Hawkins, Richard Beymer, Maximilian Schell, and Annette Gorman, with an early screen appearance from Lana Wood, the sister of Natalie Wood.

Original play
The play premiered at the Comedy Theatre in London's West End in July 1958, and opened at the Music Box Theatre on Broadway on December 2, 1959, and closed October 1, 1960, after 337 performances. The young Juliet Mills, a teenager at the time, played the role of Pamela Harrington, and was nominated for a Tony Award for her performance.

Plot
It follows a few days in the lives of the Harringtons, who are at war. While the husband and wife fight each other, the son and daughter are on the same path. Then, when a music teacher comes in, things begin to change for the better, until other things start to threaten the peace.

Cast
 Rosalind Russell as Louise Harrington
 Jack Hawkins as Stanley Harrington
 Richard Beymer as Philip Harrington
 Annette Gorman as Pamela Harrington
 Maximilian Schell as Walter
 Lana Wood as Mary
 Terry Huntingdon as Helen

References

External links 

1962 films
Films based on plays by Peter Shaffer
Columbia Pictures films
1958 plays
Plays by Peter Shaffer
Films directed by Daniel Mann
Films scored by Jerome Moross
1962 drama films
American drama films
1960s English-language films
1960s American films